Rectory Rangers Football Club is an intermediate-level football club playing in the Intermediate A division of the Mid-Ulster Football League in Northern Ireland. They play home games at Brownstown Park in Portadown, County Armagh. The club plays in the Irish Cup.

References

External links
 Daily Mirror Mid-Ulster Football League Official website

Association football clubs in Northern Ireland
Association football clubs in County Armagh
Mid-Ulster Football League clubs